Nancenoy (meaning Noah's valley) is a hamlet near Constantine in west Cornwall, England, UK.

The Trengilly Wartha Inn is a pub and restaurant which has won the GPG Dining Pub of the Year.

References

Hamlets in Cornwall